The Francois Fiedler Foundation was established in 2006 to safeguard the life-work of François Fiedler, a Czechoslovakia-born French painter and printmaker. Furthermore, its mission is to spread the study and understanding of modern art and contemporary art.

François Fiedler is one of the most important artists in the post-war Modernist School of Paris. After World War II, he settled in France, where he became fascinated with Lyrical Abstraction. He was discovered by Joan Miró, who called Fiedler "the painter of light". Miró, Georges Braque, Marc Chagall, Alexander Calder, Eduardo Chillida, Fiedler, Alberto Giacometti, Fernand Léger, Henri Matisse, Jean-Paul Riopelle, Antoni Tàpies a great circle gathered and was joined by a new generation of artists. Fiedler created a unique style in lyrical abstraction.

The only European artist, Francois Fiedler was represented in the exhibition "The Persistence of Pollock” celebrating the 100th anniversary of the birth of Jackson Pollock, the titan of Abstract Expressionism. The exhibition was held at the Pollock-Krasner House and Studio, which is the house where Jackson Pollock lived and created the 20th-century abstract expressionism masterpieces, so-called drip painting.
“I entered the painting... I felt the dramatic force. The pictorial energy of canvas enchanted me. I felt the full freedom of the rhythms. I recognized the duality in Pollock’s works - improvisation and precise interpretation at the same time. I was fascinated by the works of Pollock and definitely influenced my own working methods.” said Fiedler on the occasion of “Pollock Retrospective” held at Centre Georges Pompidou in 1981, Paris.

References 

Foundations based in France